The 2013 NWSL Supplemental Draft took place on February 7, 2013.

Round 1

Round 2

Round 3

Round 4

Round 5

Round 6

See also
List of NWSL drafts
List of foreign NWSL players

References

External links
 NWSL Supplemental Draft to Commence at Noon ET on Feb. 7
 NWSL Announces Supplemental Draft and Discovery Player Process

2013
Draft
NWSL Supplemental Draft